This page lists notable alumni and former students, faculty, and administrators of Antioch College.

Alumni

Art, Architecture, and Engineering 
 Emma Amos (B.A. 1968), postmodernist African-American painter and printmaker
 Kathan Brown (B.A. 1958), printmaker, writer, lecturer, entrepreneur and founder of Crown Point Press
 (B.A. 1968) printmaker, activist, co-founder of Women's Press Collective, Oakland.
 Peter Calthorpe (B.A. 1972), architect, urban designer, urban planner, and author. Founding member of The Congress for the New Urbanism.
 Jewell James Ebers (1946), electrical engineer
 Wendy Ewald (B.A. 1974), photographer, professor at Duke University
 Carole Harmel (B.A. 1969), photographer, artist, educator, co-founder of Artemisia Gallery women's cooperative in Chicago (1973)
 Peter Jacobs (B.A. 1961), landscape architect, Emeritus Professor of Landscape Architecture, Université de Montréal
 Brian Shure (B.A. 1974), has taught in the printmaking department at Rhode Island School of Design since 1996
 Leilah Weinraub (2003), filmmaker, conceptual artist

Activists 
 John Bachtell (1978), chairman of the Communist Party USA
 Olympia Brown (1860), suffragist, women's rights activist, minister
 Mariana Wright Chapman (ca. 1857), social reformer, suffragist
 Lucy Salisbury Doolittle (1832-1908), philanthropist
 Leo Drey (1939), conservationist
 Jeff Mackler (1963), national secretary of Socialist Action
 José Ramos-Horta (1984), co-recipient of the Nobel Peace Prize in 2007, East Timor independence activist, Head of the United Nations Integrated Peacebuilding Office in Guinea-Bissau, former Prime Minister and President of East Timor
 Marty Rosenbluth (1999), immigration attorney and civil rights activist.
 Coretta Scott King (1951), human rights activist and wife of Martin Luther King Jr.
Frances Cress Welsing (1957), psychiatrist and author of The Isis Papers

Business
 Warren Bennis (1951), distinguished Professor of Business Administration at the University of Southern California; Chair of the Advisory Board of the Harvard University Kennedy School's Center for Public Leadership; author of more than thirty books on leadership
 Theodore Levitt (1949), economist
 Jay W. Lorsch (1955), Louis Kirstein Professor of Human Relations at the Harvard Business School

Education
 Edythe Scott Bagley (1947), Professor of Theater and Performing Arts, Cheyney University of Pennsylvania
 Drucilla Cornell (1978), philosopher, feminist theorist, and legal theorist
 Shelton H. Davis (1965), public-interest anthropologist
 Lisa Delpit (1974), author of Other People's Children; director of the Center for Urban Educational Excellence
 Frances Degen Horowitz (B.A. 1954), educator and psychologist, President Emerita of City University of New York Graduate School and University Center.
 Deborah Meier (1954), educator, considered the founder of the modern small schools movement
 Tom Mooney (educator) (B.A. 1975), American labor leader and teacher
 Brian Shure (B.A. 1974), teaching in the printmaking department at Rhode Island School of Design since 1996
James A.F. Stoner (B.S. in engineering science in 1959) Holder of James A.F. Stoner Chair in Global Quality Leadership at Fordham University, author.

Entertainment
 Peter Adair (1967), filmmaker
 Peggy Ahwesh (1978), filmmaker and video artist
 Idris Ackamoor (1973), musician, founder of jazz collective The Pyramids
 Ray Benson (1974), front man of Asleep at the Wheel, actor and voice actor
 Nick DeMartino, former Senior Vice President, Media and Technology for the American Film Institute
 Nathaniel Dorsky (1943), video artist and author
 Suzanne Fiol, founder of ISSUE Project Room
 John Flansburgh (1983), singer/songwriter, They Might Be Giants
 Herb Gardner (1958), playwright
 Miles Goodman (1972), film composer and record producer
 Theo Hakola (1977), singer/songwriter/musician and novelist
 John Hammond Jr., blues guitarist/vocalist
 Victoria Hochberg (1964), film/television writer/director 
 Ken Jenkins (1963), actor on Scrubs
 Nick Katzman, blues musician
 Jorma Kaukonen (1962), guitarist/vocalist, Jefferson Airplane
 John Korty (1959), TV and screenwriter, Emmy for The Autobiography of Miss Jane Pittman, Oscar for documentary of Japanese internment camps
 Peter Kurland, Academy Award-nominated sound mixer
 Arthur Lithgow (1938), actor, director, pioneer of regional theater
 Alan Lloyd, composer closely associated with the works of Robert Wilson
 Leonard Nimoy (MA 1977), actor, film director, poet, musician and photographer; played the role of Mr. Spock in the original Star Trek TV series
 Julia Reichert (BA 1970), documentary filmmaker, director, producer
 Linda Reisman (BA 1980), film producer
 Cliff Robertson (1946), Academy Award-winning actor
 Rod Serling (1950), creator of The Twilight Zone TV series
 Louise Smith (BA 1977), playwright and actress; Obie Award recipient
 Jay Tuck (1968), television producer for ARD German television, author
 David Wilcox, folk musician and singer-songwriter
 Mia Zapata (1989), lead singer of The Gits

Government
 Chester G. Atkins (1970), former United States Representative
 Joseph H. Ball (1929), journalist, politician and businessman, United States Senator
 Lynn J. Bush (1948), Senior Judge for the United States Court of Federal Claims
 LaDoris Cordell (BA 1971), retired judge of the Superior Court of California
 Bill Bradbury (1960), Oregon Secretary of State
 John de Jongh (1981), United States Virgin Islands Governor
 LaShann Moutique DeArcy Hall (1992), District Judge for the United States District Court for the Eastern District of New York
 Hattie N. Harrison, member of the Maryland House of Delegates
 Joanne Head, member of the New Hampshire House of Representatives
 A. Leon Higginbotham Jr. (1949), civil rights advocate; author; Judge of the United States Court of Appeals for the Third Circuit (1977-1993), and of the United States District Court for the Eastern District of Pennsylvania (1964-1977); Chief Judge of the Third Circuit from 1990-1991; received the Presidential Medal of Freedom in 1995
 J. Warren Keifer, prominent U.S. politician during the 1880s, 30th Speaker of the U.S. House of Representatives
 Gail D. Mathieu (1973), B.A., current United States Ambassador to Namibia and former United States Ambassador to Niger
 Eleanor Holmes Norton (1960), Congressional Delegate, representing the District of Columbia; Chair, U.S. Equal Employment Opportunity Commission, 1977-1981 (first female Chair is USEEOC); Professor of Law, Georgetown University Law Center (1982-2019).
 Americus V. Rice, Civil War general, U.S. Representative
 Richard Socarides (BA 1976), political strategist, commentator
 E. Denise Simmons, mayor of Cambridge, Massachusetts, and the first openly lesbian African-American mayor of an American city
 Webster Street, Arizona Territorial Judge

Literature & Journalism
 Lawrence Block (1960), author
 Peg Bracken (1940), humorist
 Eliza Archard Conner (1838-1912), journalist, lecturer, and feminist 
 James Galvin (1974), poet and author
 Michael Goldfarb (1972), author and journalist
 Jaimy Gordon (1966), author of Lord of Misrule, winner of the National Book Award
 Karl Grossman (1964), journalist and author
 Virginia Hamilton (1957), children's books author and MacArthur Fellow
Heather Holland (1999), poet (Old LP’s), Literary Journalist
 Peter Irons (1966), legal historian and author
 Laurence Leamer (1964), author and journalist
 Franz Lidz (1973), journalist and author whose memoir, Unstrung Heroes, became a 1995 feature film directed by Diane Keaton
 Sylvia Nasar (1970), author, A Beautiful Mind
 Cary Nelson (1967), higher education activist, author
 Gregory Orr (poet) poet and author
 Marc Anthony Richardson (1995), novelist and artist, American Book Award winner for Year of the Rat
 John Robbins (1976), author of Diet for a New America; pioneer environmentalist; veganism advocate
 Bianca Stone (2006), poet and visual artist
 Mark Strand (1957), poet
 Nova Ren Suma (1997), author of young adult novels
 Terri Windling (1979), influential mythic fiction and speculative fiction editor, author and artist

MacArthur Fellows 
 Tim Barrett (B.A. 1973), papermaker 
 Lisa Delpit (B.A. 1974), education reform leader 
 Wendy Ewald (B.A. 1974), photographer 
 Stephen Jay Gould (B.S. 1963), paleontologist 
 Virginia Hamilton (attended 1952–55), writer
 Sylvia A. Law (B.A. 1964), human rights lawyer
 Deborah Meier (attended 1949-1951), education reform leader
 Mark Strand (B.A. 1957), poet and writer

Science and medicine
 Barbara Almond (B.S. 1959), psychiatrist and psychoanalyst
 Joseph Young Bergen (1872), botanist
 Mario Capecchi (B.S. 1961), co-recipient of the Nobel Prize in Physiology or Medicine in 2007
 Don Clark (1953), clinical psychologist, author
 Leland C. Clark Jr. (B.S. 1941), biochemist and inventor
 George W. Comstock (1937), physician, public health expert, lead researcher in seminal studies demonstrating the effectiveness of isoniazid for treating latent tuberculosis infection
 William A. Gamson (1946), sociologist, President of American Sociological Association
 Clifford Geertz (1950), anthropologist
 Stephen Jay Gould (1963), geologist, evolutionary biologist, author
 Sheena Hill (2005), psychotherapist and parenting coach. Founder of Parenting Works.
 Robert Manry (1949), nautical explorer
 Richard Pillard (1955), professor of psychiatry at Boston University; first openly gay psychiatrist in the U.S.
 Allan Pred (1957), geographer
 Sonya Rose (1958), sociologist and historian
 Joan Steitz (1963), molecular biologist and Sterling Professor at Yale University; 2018 Lasker Award recipient
 Judith G. Voet (B.S. 1963), professor of chemistry and biochemistry at Swarthmore College; author of several widely used biochemistry textbooks

Technology
 Brian Aker, (B.S. 1994), open-source hacker

Faculty
 Louis C. Fraina, professor of Economics, founding member of the American Communist Party 
 Irwin Abrams, professor of History, pioneer in the field of peace research
 G. Stanley Hall, professor of English and philosophy; first president of the American Psychological Association and Clark University
 Edward Orton, Sr., first president of the Ohio State University
 Cecil Taylor, American pianist and poet, pioneer of free jazz
 Horace Mann, Founding president of Antioch College and "father of American Education"
 Mary Tyler Peabody Mann, American author and educator
 Arthur Ernest Morgan, President of Antioch and chairman of Tennessee Valley Authority
 Hendrik Willem van Loon, historian, geographer, journalist, author
 Tony Conrad, American video artist, experimental filmmaker, musician, composer, sound artist, teacher, and writer

References

Antioch College people
People